The fourth wave of Walt Disney Treasures was released December 7, 2004. This is the only wave that comes in White cases, and is the final wave that is in double DVD cases. Starting with this wave, the side strap was replaced with seal wrap with stickers and the back was no longer printed on the tin but included as a card glued to the back.

Mickey Mouse in Black and White, Volume Two

This set covers the remaining Mickey Mouse cartoon shorts released in black and white.

175,000 sets produced.

Disc one
The Barn Dance (1929)
The Opry House (1929)
When the Cat's Away (1929)
The Barnyard Battle (1929)
The Plowboy (1929)
Mickey's Choo-Choo (1929)
The Jazz Fool (1929)
Jungle Rhythm (1929)
Wild Waves (1929)
Just Mickey (also known as Fiddling Around) (1930)
The Barnyard Concert (1930)
The Cactus Kid (1930)
The Shindig (1930)
The Picnic (1930)
Traffic Troubles (1931)
The Castaway (1931)
Fishin' Around (1931)
The Beach Party (1931)
The Barnyard Broadcast (1931)
The Mad Dog (1932)
Barnyard Olympics (1932)

Bonus features
"Mickey Mania: Collecting Mickey Merchandise": Maltin visits Bernie Shine, collector extraordinaire. They discuss what makes Mickey so appealing, then Shine takes us on a tour of his vast amassing of Mickey memorabilia from all over the globe, most of it dating back to the 1920s and 30s.
"Mickey's Portrait Artist: John Hench": Maltin interviews famed Disney artist John Hench about Mickey. Hench was the man in charge of painting Mickey for his birthdays throughout the years.

Disc two
Musical Farmer (1932)
Trader Mickey (1932)
The Wayward Canary (1932)
Mickey's Pal Pluto (1933)
Mickey's Mechanical Man (1933)
Playful Pluto (1934)
Mickey's Steam Roller (1934)
Mickey Plays Papa (1934)
Mickey's Kangaroo (1935)

From the vault
The Haunted House (1929)
The Moose Hunt (1931)
The Delivery Boy (1931)
The Grocery Boy (1932)
Mickey in Arabia (1932)
Mickey's Good Deed (1932)
Mickey's Mellerdrammer (1933)
The Steeple Chase (1933, wrong opening music, its plays Donald Duck theme)
Shanghaied (1934)
Mickey's Man Friday (1935)

Bonus features
"Background paintings": Backgrounds of the various cartoon shorts on this set
"Animation drawings": Drawings of the same cartoons, animating and storyboard
"Mickey's Poster Archive": Posters for many of the shorts shown on this set
"Mickey Mouse Fully Covered": Various merchandise covers, such as books, magazines and records
"Mickey's Sunday Funnies": This section shows off the comic strips of the many Mickey adventures, complete with a biography of creator Floyd Gottfredson.

The Complete Pluto

This set covers the first half of Pluto's career.

110,000 sets produced.

Disc one
1930
The Chain Gang (replaced by The Beach Party on region 2 editions)
1935
On Ice
1937
Pluto's Quin-puplets
1939
Beach Picnic
1940
Bone Trouble
1941
Pluto's Playmate
Canine Caddy
Lend a Paw
1942
The Army Mascot
Pluto, Junior
The Sleepwalker
T-Bone for Two
Pluto at the Zoo

Bonus Features
The Life and Times of Pluto: Maltin discusses Pluto's characteristics with current animator Andreas Deja, long-time animators Frank Thomas and Ollie Johnston, and animation historian John Canemaker.
Pluto 101: Maltin again meets with Deja, who relates the value of studying classic cartoon shorts to aid in his ability to animate successfully. He then takes Leonard to the drawing board, where he shows how to bring Pluto to life from just one circle, the way he did in a sequence for the 1990 featurette The Prince and the Pauper.

Disc two
1943
Pluto and the Armadillo
Private Pluto
1944
Springtime for Pluto
First Aiders
1945
Dog Watch
Canine Casanova
The Legend of Coyote Rock
Canine Patrol
1946
Pluto's Kid Brother
In Dutch
Squatter's Rights
The Purloined Pup
1947
Pluto's Housewarming
From the Vault
Pantry Pirate (1940)
A Gentleman's Gentleman (1941)
Bonus Features
Pluto's Picture Book: This is the second half of the Disneyland episode, A Story of Dogs, which was aired as part of a promotion for Lady and the Tramp (the making of which the first half of this episode covers). The second half of this episode talks about Disney's first canine star, using a picture book, from which Pluto leaps and into which Pluto looks while Walt narrates and we get a look at some of the highlights of Pluto's career.
Pluto's Pal Fergy: This is a mini-biography about "the man behind the mutt": Norman Ferguson, who helped bring the dog to life. This talks about Ferguson not only creating Pluto, but also some of the other things at Disney he did.
Galleries
Pluto On Paper: Several Pluto comic strips are shown, as are Pluto book and magazine covers. The comics are designed masterfully so one can actually read along frame by frame.
Pluto's Posters: Posters for many of the cartoons presented on this set are depicted.
Background Paintings: The backdrops for a small handful of the cartoons presented are shown.
Animation Drawings: A host of drawings, storyboard and otherwise, for the same small handful of cartoons as in the "Background Paintings" section.

The Mickey Mouse Club

This set contains the first week of the Mickey Mouse Club program, originally broadcast October 3–7, 1955.

130,000 sets produced.

Disc one
Fun With Music Day (Monday)
Guest Star Day (Tuesday)
Anything Can Happen Day (Wednesday)
Bonus Features
The Leader of the Club
Galleries
Inside the Clubhouse
Spreading the Word: Mouseke-Promotion
Sketching the Ideas

Disc two
Circus Day (Thursday)
Talent Round-Up Day (Friday)
Bonus Features
Mouseke-Memories
The Mouseketeers Debut at Disneyland
Opening Sequence in Color

4